Methylohalobius is a bacterial genus from the family of Methylococcaceae.

References

Further reading 
 
 
 

Monotypic bacteria genera
Bacteria genera